Franz Alhusaine Drameh (born 5 January 1993) is an English actor. His film debut was in Clint Eastwood's fantasy drama, Hereafter (2010). He also appeared in British film Attack the Block (2011) and the 2014 blockbuster Edge of Tomorrow. He played Jefferson Jackson/Firestorm in The CW's The Flash’s second season as well as the first three seasons of Legends of Tomorrow (2016–2018), and portrayed Boots in the Apple TV+ series See (2019–2021).

Filmography

Film

Television

References

External links

English male film actors
Black British male actors
English male television actors
English people of Gambian descent
21st-century English male actors
1993 births
Living people
People from Skegness